DWX may refer to:

 DWX, a line of semiautomatic pistols by Dan Wesson Firearms
 DWX (business), a Syrian stock exchange
 DWX (railway station), an Indian railway junction station
 Dixon Airport, Dixon, Wyoming (IATA code: DWX)